The New Zealand Trophy (Japanese ニュージーランドトロフィー) is a Japanese Grade 2 flat horse race in Japan for three-year-old Thoroughbreds. It is run over a distance of 1600 metres at Nakayama Racecourse in April.

The New Zealand Trophy was first run in 1983 and was elevated to Grade 3 status in 1984 before being promoted to Grade 2 in 1987. It serves as a trial race for the NHK Mile Cup.

Among the winners of the race have been Oguri Cap, Eishin Preston and El Condor Pasa.

Winners 

 The 2011 race took place at Hanshin Racecourse.

See also
 Horse racing in Japan
 List of Japanese flat horse races

References

Turf races in Japan